Oleksandr Beresch (12 October 1977, Pervomaisk – 29 February 2004, Kyiv) was a gymnast from Ukraine and Olympic medallist at the 2000 Sydney Games.

Coached by former Soviet World Champion Igor Korobchinsky, Beresch began competing internationally for Ukraine in 1997, winning a bronze medal on the high bar at his first World Championships.  Over the next several years he became the preeminent male gymnast on the Ukrainian team, medalling at the World Cup several times.

Beresch's breakout year was 2000; in this year he was the European all-around and high bar champion, as well as the bronze all-around medalist at the 2000 Olympics.  His contributions to the Ukrainian team helped them win their first team medal, a silver, in Sydney.  He continued to turn in strong performances after the Olympics, winning three medals at the 2001 World Artistic Gymnastics Championships and winning the high bar gold at the 2000 World finals in Paris.

Accident

In February 2004, when Beresch was driving through Kyiv, his Peugeot was struck by a speeding car travelling at over 150 kilometres per hour.  He was killed; his passenger, teammate Sergei Vyaltsev, survived with critical injuries.

Beresch's death was met with shock and sorrow by the international gymnastics community.  Former Ukrainian Gymnastics Federation president Ludmilla Tourischeva issued a public statement, saying "there are no words to express our grief."  Several memorials to Beresch were held, including an emotional video tribute at the 2004 European Championships.

References

Sources
 
 Profile at International Gymnast
 
 "Romanian men Europe's best" Inside Gymnastics magazine, 16 April 2004
 "Beresch loses life" Inside Gymnastics magazine, 1 March 2004

External links
 

1977 births
2004 deaths
Ukrainian male artistic gymnasts
Gymnasts at the 2000 Summer Olympics
Road incident deaths in Ukraine
Medalists at the World Artistic Gymnastics Championships
Olympic silver medalists for Ukraine
Olympic bronze medalists for Ukraine
Olympic medalists in gymnastics
Medalists at the 2000 Summer Olympics
European champions in gymnastics
Sportspeople from Luhansk Oblast
20th-century Ukrainian people